Lhasa Carpet Factory is a factory south of Yanhe Dong Lu near the Tibet University in Lhasa, the capital of the Tibet Autonomous Region of the People's Republic of China. It produces traditional Tibetan rugs that are exported worldwide through Canton.

Sources
Passport Books: Tibet (1986), Shangri-la Press

Buildings and structures in Lhasa
Textile companies of China
Carpet manufacturing companies